Begum Hazrat Mahal  (c. 18207 April 1879), also known as the Begum of Awadh, was the second wife of Nawab of Awadh Wajid Ali Shah, and the regent of Awadh in 1857–1858. She is known for the leading role she had in the rebellion against the British East India Company during the Indian Rebellion of 1857.

After her husband had been exiled to Calcutta and the Indian Rebellion broke out, she made her son, Prince Birjis Qadr, the Wali (ruler) of Awadh, with herself as regent during his minority. However, she was forced to abandon this role after a short reign.  By way of Hallaur, she finally found asylum in Nepal, where she died in 1879. Her role in the rebellion has given her a heroine status in the post-colonial history of India.

Biography

Early life
Begum Hazrat Mahal's name was Mohammadi Khanum, and she was born in 1820 at Faizabad, the former capital of Oudh State. She was sold by her parents and became a courtesan by profession. She entered the royal harem as a Khawasin after having been sold to Royal agents, where she was promoted to a pari, and was known as Mahek Pari.

She became a Begum after being accepted as a royal concubine of the King of Awadh, the last Tajdaar-e-Awadh, Wajid Ali Shah; became his junior wife and the title 'Hazrat Mahal' was bestowed on her after the birth of their son, Birjis Qadr.  In 1856, the British annexed Awadh, and Wajid Ali Shah was exiled to Calcutta.  Begum Hazrat Mahal remained in Lucknow with her son and soon took charge of the affairs of the rebel state of Awadh as it entered armed struggle with the British East India Company.

Indian Rebellion of 1857

During the Indian Rebellion of 1857, Begum Hazrat Mahal's band of supporters rebelled against the forces of the British under the leadership of Raja Jalal Singh; they seized control of Lucknow, and she took power as the guardian of her minor son, Prince Birjis Qadr, whom she had declared as the ruler (Wali) of Awadh.  As regent, she automatically came to have a leadership role in the rebellion against the British.

One of the principal complaints of Begum Hazrat Mahal was that the English East India Company had casually demolished Temples and mosques just to make way for roads. In a proclamation issued during the final days of the revolt, she mocked the British claim to allow freedom of worship: 

Hazrat Mahal worked in association with Nana Saheb, but later joined the Maulavi of Faizabad in the attack on Shahjahanpur. When the forces under the command of the British re-captured Lucknow and most of Oudh, she was forced to retreat.

Later life

Ultimately, she had to retreat to Nepal, where she was initially refused asylum by the Rana prime minister Jung Bahadur, but was later allowed to stay.

She died there in 1879 and was buried in a nameless grave in the grounds of Kathmandu's Jama Masjid.

After her death, on the occasion of the jubilee of Queen Victoria (1887), the British Government pardoned Birjis Qadr and he was allowed to return home.

Memorials

Begum Hazrat Mahal's tomb is located in the central part of Kathmandu near Jama Masjid, Ghantaghar, not far away from the famous Darbar Marg. It is looked after by the Jama Masjid Central Committee.

On 15 August 1962, Mahal was honoured at the Old Victoria Park in Hazratganj, Lucknow for her role in the Great Revolt. Along with the renaming of the park, a marble memorial was constructed, which includes a marble tablet with four round brass plaques bearing the Coat of Arms of the Awadh royal family. The park has been used for Ramlilas and bonfires during Dusshera, as well as Lucknow Mahotsava (Lucknow Exposition).

On 10 May 1984, the Government of India issued a commemorative stamp in honour of Mahal. The first day cover was designed by C.R. Pakrashi, and the cancellation was done by Alka Sharma. 15,00,000 stamps were issued.

The Ministry of Minority Affairs, Government of India has started the Begum Hazrat Mahal National Scholarship for Meritorious Girls belonging to minority communities in India. This scholarship is implemented through the Maulana Azad Education Foundation.

Gallery

References

External links
  Begum Hazrat Mahal Biography
  1857 – India's Struggle for Freedom – Begum Hazrat Mahal
 People took charge in Awadh
 LUCKNOW IN 1857–58: THE EPIC SIEGE
 The 1857 Uprising in the History of Freedom Struggle
 Miserable condition of the grave of a warrior lady
 Freedom fighters of India

1879 deaths
Indian women in war
Women in 19th-century warfare
Revolutionaries of the Indian Rebellion of 1857
Military personnel from Lucknow
Indian independence activists from Uttar Pradesh
Indian rebels
Indian courtesans
1820 births
Indian queen consorts
History of Awadh
19th-century Indian women
Military personnel from Uttar Pradesh
Women Indian independence activists
Women from Uttar Pradesh
19th-century Indian Muslims
Burials in Nepal
Indian slaves
Slave concubines